Tipu Sultan Kanda Kanasu (English: The Dreams of Tipu Sultan) is a 1997 Kannada play written by Girish Karnad. The play has been performed many times by different groups around the world but mostly in India and Pakistan. The story follows the last days as well as the historic moments in the life of the Ruler of Mysore, Tipu Sultan, (1750–1799) through the eyes of an Indian court historian and a British Oriental scholar.

Girish Karnad's play is based on a Farsi manuscript written by Tipu Sultan in his own handwriting preserved in the India Office Library.  It was  later translated and published as The Dreams of Tipu Sultan. In this text, Tipu Sultan recorded some of his dreams from  1785 to 1798. Several of the dreams are about defeating the unbelievers, the Marathas and the Nazarenes (i.e, the English), and visions of the Prophet, the companions of the Prophet and Islamic sages.

Girish Karnad's play uses four of the 37 dreams for his play: Dream 9, Dream 10, Dream 13 and fourth one as having victory over the British. Mir Hussain Ali Khan Kirmani (active 1781-1802), who wrote "History of Tipu Sultan: Being a Continuation of The Neshani Hyduri" (an English Translation appeared in 1864), is also a character in Girish Karnad's play.

The Jordanian scholars Khawaldeh and Neimneh conclude in an article that "what Karnad wishes to achieve, through this counter-historical theatrical project, is to dismantle the image of the ruthless and unprincipled 'Other' propagated by British historians, dramatists, and performers by creating or even recreating an alternative humane and noble character of Tipu Sultan."

See also 
 Tipu Sultan

Translations

 Collected Plays: Taledanda, the Fire and the Rain, the Dreams of Tipu Sultan, Flowers and Images: Two Dramatic Monologues: Flowers : Broken Images, Vol. 2. Oxford University Press, USA. 2005.

References

External links

 The Dreams of Tipu Sultan

Indian plays
Kannada literature
Plays set in the 18th century
Plays based on actual events
History of Mysore
History of India in fiction
Plays set in India
Plays based on real people
Cultural depictions of male monarchs
Cultural depictions of Indian men
1997 plays